Alraune is a 1918 Hungarian science fiction horror film directed by Michael Curtiz and Edmund Fritz.  It starred Géza Erdélyi. Little is known about this film which is now believed to be lost. Alraune is German for "Mandrake".  The film is based on a novel by German novelist Hanns Heinz Ewers published in 1911.

The plot is a variation on the original legend of Alraune in which a Mad Scientist creates a beautiful—but demonic—child from the forced union between a woman and a mandrake root fed by the blood of a hanged man.

Cast

See also
 Michael Curtiz filmography
 List of lost films
 Alraune (1928 film), remake

References 

 Wingrove, David. Science Fiction Film Source Book (Longman Group Limited, 1985)

External links 
 

Hungarian black-and-white films
Lost horror films
Films directed by Michael Curtiz
Hungarian silent feature films
Films based on works by Hanns Heinz Ewers
Hungarian science fiction films
Mad scientist films
1910s science fiction horror films
Lost Hungarian films
Hungarian horror films
1918 horror films
1918 lost films
Silent science fiction horror films